Falaschi is a surname. Notable people with the surname include:

 Arturo Falaschi (1933–2010), Italian geneticist
 Edu Falaschi (born 1972), Brazilian musician
 Francesco Falaschi (born 1961), Italian film director and screenwriter
 Guido Falaschi (1989–2011), Argentine racecar driver
 Marco Falaschi (born 1987), Italian volleyball player
 Nello Falaschi (1913–1986), American football player 
 Nermin Vlora Falaschi (1921–2004), Albanian intellectual
 Roberto Falaschi (1931–2009), Italian professional racing cyclist

See also
 Figoni et Falaschi, French coachbuilder

Italian-language surnames